October (French - Saison d'octobre) is an 1878 painting by Jules Bastien-Lepage, now in the National Gallery of Victoria in Melbourne. It is also known as Picking Potatoes (récolte des pommes de terre), The Potato Gatherers or Woman Gathering Potatoes.

Bastien-Lepage painted it in his native village of Damvillers, whose name is written in the work's lower-left corner just above the artist's signature. It was first exhibited at the 1879 Paris Salon and the Russian painter Vasily Surikov saw it in Paris in December 1883, writing to his colleague Pavel Chistyakov at the end of that month:

In 1885 (the year after the painter's death) it was acquired by his brother Émile Bastien-Lepage. Next it was acquired in 1897 by the Australian entrepreneur George McCulloch, who had moved to London in the early 1890s and started collecting paintings. After McCulloch's death in 1907, the painting passed to his widow Mary Coutts Michie. In October 1927 the painting was acquired by the Australian Felton Bequest Foundation, based on funds bequeathed by Alfred Felton and in 1928 it was transferred to its present owner.

References

1878 paintings
Paintings in the collection of the National Gallery of Victoria
Paintings by Jules Bastien-Lepage
Farming in art